The second and final season of the television series Jonas, rebranded Jonas L.A. for this season, aired on Disney Channel from June 20, 2010 to October 3, 2010, and included 13 episodes. It follows the five main characters of the series as they spend their summer vacation in Los Angeles after the Jonas' tour was over, a few months after the events of the first season.

The season was never officially released on DVD, being available only in digital format. After the season finale, it was announced that the show would not be returning for another season.

Production
The series was originally set in New Jersey, before the setting changed to Los Angeles for the second season and was shot at Hollywood Center Studios, which has also been the home to several other Disney Channel sitcoms over the years including The Suite Life on Deck and Wizards of Waverly Place. As of November 2010, JONAS L.A. was the only live-action Disney Channel Original Series, produced by It's a Laugh Productions, not filmed before a live studio audience.

Disney Channel has officially announced, in November 2010, that JONAS L.A. will not return. They mentioned that they will be working with the Jonas Brothers in the future.

Opening sequence
The theme song for JONAS L.A. is "Live to Party", performed by the Jonas Brothers (as Jonas).

The opening sequence shows the main cast members as the Jonas perform a song, with the creator's names appearing in the second-to-last part. The show's title logo has been redesigned to match the series new theme.

Cast

Main
Joe Jonas as Joe Lucas
Nick Jonas as Nick Lucas
Kevin Jonas as Kevin Percy Lucas
Chelsea Staub as Stella Malone 
Nicole Anderson as Macy Misa

Recurring
Adam Hicks as Dennis "DZ" Zimmer
Chris Warren Jr. as Jake Williams
Abby Pivaronas as Vanessa Paige
Beth Crosby as Lisa Malone
Debi Mazar as Mona Klein
China Anne McClain as Kiara Tyshanna
John Ducey as Tom Lucas

Music

Some of the songs for this season (such as L.A. Baby and Feelin' Alive) were used to promote the season two of JONAS. The soundtrack was officially released on July 20, 2010.

Episodes

References

External links
 

2010 American television seasons